Kaveh Rastegar is a Persian-American Grammy-nominated songwriter, record producer, composer, and bass guitarist. Rastegar was born in Montreal and raised in Denver, Colorado. He currently resides in the Los Angeles/Pasadena area with his fiancé and children.

For over twenty years, Kaveh Rastegar has been an integral part of a broad range of musical projects collaborating as a producer, songwriter, or a bass player. He is well known as the founding member of Grammy nominated group Kneebody and for many years he's also been bassist with John Legend (appearing alongside him in the musical La La Land). He's recorded with artists such as Bruce Springsteen (also appearing in his 2019 film "Western Stars"), Ringo Starr, Shania Twain, and Beck and in films such as Daddy's Home, The Big Sick and Walk Hard. He also served as musical director with Sia, appearing with her on Saturday Night Live. As a songwriter he has written with artists such as Bruno Mars, De La Soul, Ciara, Cee-Lo Green, Meshell Ndegeocello and Kimbra. In addition to his work collaborating with other artists, Rastegar has written, produced and released his own albums as an artist including "Light of Love" (2018) and "Haunted This Way" (2019). In 2020, Rastegar played bass alongside Sting in his musical The Last Ship.

Most recently, Rastegar co-wrote "Collide", a record by Tiana Major9 and Earthgang for the iconic film “Queen and Slim”. “Collide”, an uplifting anthem celebrating Black Love was nominated for a Grammy in the category for “Best R&B Song”. He has also been working closely with R&B artist Sabrina Claudio, co-writing with and co-producing on a handful of her projects, including “Truth Is”, “No Rain No Flowers”, “Christmas Blues” which includes features from superstars The Weeknd and Alicia Keys, and her latest album "Based On A Feeling". Rastegar is also currently collaborating with Cynthia Erivo on her upcoming album, set to release early 2021.
He lives with his wife, Sara, and two children in Los Angeles San Marino, CA.

Discography 
1999 – Dispenza – Four Songs (EP)
2000 – Old Sol – EP
2002 – Wendel – Wendel
2002 – Dakah – Unfinished Symphony
2002 – Shane Endsley – 2nd Guess
2002 – Michael Andrews – Cypher soundtrack
2002 – Michael Andrews – Orange County soundtrack
2002 – Baba Alade – Unified and One
2003 – Dakah – Live at California Plaza 07/05/03
2003 – Pan Dulce – Pan Dulce
2003 – Dj Haul e Mason – Cell: Eight
2003 – Arik Marshall – Fantaseality
2003 – Kneebody – Live Fall 2003
2004 – Dakah – Live in Los Angeles 07/02/04
2004 – Dakah – Live in San Francisco 07/31/04
2004 – Thruster – Thruster!
2004 – Thruster – Live in Seattle 04/02/2004
2004 – Casey Black – Vacations
2004 – Click Boom – The Freak Went Suite
2004 – Keven Brennan – God Is a Mighty Gourd
2004 – Keaton Simons – Currently (EP)
2004 – Michael Andrews – Wonderfalls soundtrack
2005 – Kneebody – Kneebody
2005 – Dj Haul – Half Baked Goods
2005 – Branden Harper – Tangents
2005 – Keaton Simons – Exes and Whys
2005 – Celeste Prince – Lady Sings
2005 – Christopher Wong – Journey from the Fall soundtrack
2005 – Uri Caine & Nate Wood – Shelf Life soundtrack
2006 – Kneebody – Live Volume One
2006 – Michael Hernandez – Anonyme
2006 – John Stowers – Everything You Do
2006 – Anna Dagmar – EP
2006 – Rosey – The Old Fashioned Way
2006 – Jurassic 5 – Feedback
2007 – Kneebody – Low Electrical Worker
2007 – Thruster – Green Heat
2007 – John Rogers – Satori
2007 – Tony Scott – A Jazz Life
2007 – Colin Hay – Are You Looking at Me?
2008 – Kneebody – Live Volume 2: Italy
2008 – Kneebody & Theo Bleckmann – 12 Songs by Charles Ives
2008 – Chewy Puma – Macabre Cadabre
2008 – Allensworth – Broken Leaves
2008 – Raya Yarbrough – Raya Yarbrough
2008 – The Ditty Bops – Summer Rains
2008 – Richard Stekol – The Point of Stars
2009 – Erica Mou – Bacio Ancora Le Ferite
2009 – Anna Dagmar – Let the Waves Come in Threes
2009 – Colin Hay – American Sunshine
2009 – Chali 2Na – Fish Outta Water
2009 – John Gold – A Flower in Your Head
2009 – Tony Monroe – Tony Monroe – EP
2009 – Jesca Hoop – Hunting My Dress
2009 – Luciano Ligabue – Sette notti in Arena
2010 – Bruno Mars – It's Better if You Don't Understand EP
2010 – Bruno Mars – Doo Wops and Hooligans
2010 – Kneebody – You Can Have Your Moment
2010 – CeeLo Green – The Ladykiller
2010 – Luciano Ligabue – Arrivederci, mostro!
2010 – Luciano Ligabue – Arrivederci, mostro! Tutte le facce del mostro
2011 – Giusy Ferreri – Il Mio Universo
2011 – Colin Hay – Gathering Mercury
2011 – Kelly Price – Kelly
2011 – Michelle Shaprow – Purple Skies
2011 – Timothy Young – Gravitational Lensing
2011 – Anthony Hamilton – Back to Love
2011 – Laura Pausini – Inedito
2011 – Luciano Ligabue – Campovolo 2.011
2011 – Kneebody – Live Volume 3: Paris
2011 – Noemi – RossoNoemi
2012 – Kimbra – Vows
2012 – Thinking Plague – Decline and Fall
2012 – Sophie B. Hawkins – The Crossing
2012 – Matt Chamberlain – Company 23
2012 – Curtis Stigers – Let's Go Out Tonight
2012 – Michael Lington – Pure
2013 – Nick Mancini – Storyteller
2013 – Cristiano De Andre – Come in Cielo Cosi in Guerra
2013 – Che Prasad – Shiva Me Timbers
2013 – Kelly Segal and Adam Levy – Little March
2013 – Kneebody – The Line
2013 – Matt Hires – The World Won't Last Forever, But Tonight We Can Pretend
2013 – Latryx – The Second Album
2013 – Ligabue – Mondovisione
2014 – Meshell Ndegeocello – Comet Come to Me
2014 – Kimbra – The Golden Echo
2014 – Beck – Songreader
2014 – Rebecca Pidgeon – Bad Poetry
2014 – Minnie Driver – Ask Me To Dance
2015 – Charlie Puth ft. Meghan Trainor "Marvin Gaye" single
2015 – Flo Rida Ft. Fitz – "That's What I Like" single
2015 – Mikie Lee Prasad – Nowhere Special
2015 – CeeLo Green – Heart Blanche
2015 – Kneebody + Daedelus – Kneedelus
2015 – John Legend – Under The Stars
2016 – Benji Hughes – Songs in the Key of Animals
2016 – De La Soul – And the Anonymous Nobody
2017 – Bob Reynolds – Guitar Band
2017 – Shania Twain – Now
2017 – Kneebody – Anti-Hero
2017 – The Big Sick soundtrack
2017 – Ledisi – Let Love Rule
2018 – Kaveh Rastegar – Light of Love
2018 – Meshell Ndegeocello – Ventriloquism
2018 – Sabrina Claudio – "All to Me" single
2018 – Sabrina Claudio – No Rain No Flowers
2018 – Marc Lavoine – Je Reviens a Toi
2018 – Mel Parsons – Glass Heart
2018 – Elizabeth Goodfellow – Silly Sun
2018 – Simone White – Tiny Drop
2018 – Marsha Ambrosius – Nyla
2018 – Kneebody + Inara George – "How High" single
2018 – Mike Love – "Reason For The Season" single
2019 – Ringo Starr – "What's My Name"
2019 – Bruce Springsteen – "Western Stars – Songs From The Film"
2019 – Sabrina Claudio – "Truth Is"
2019 – Cinematic Orchestra – "To Believe"
2019 – The O'Jays – "The Last Word"
2019 – Kneebody – "By Fire" EP
2019 – Rebecca Pigeon – "Sudden Exposure to Therapy/Light"
2019 – Queen and Slim – "Motion Picture Soundtrack"
2019 – Tiana Major9 & Earthgang "Collide"- single
2019 – Dawn Richard – "New Breed"
2019 – Kneebody – "Chapters"
2019 – Ciara – "Beauty Marks"
2019 – Mike Love – 12 Sides of Summer
2019 – Kaveh Rastegar – "Haunted This Way"
2020 – Alain Clark – "Sunday Afternoon"
2020 – Becca Stevens – "Wonderbloom"
2020 – Adam Levy, Tamir Barzilay, Kaveh Rastegar – "California Special"
2020 – Tiana Major9 - "Think About You" single

References

External links 
 Official website
 Blogging about Luciano Ligabue

1975 births
Living people
American jazz bass guitarists
American male bass guitarists
American jazz composers
American male jazz composers
Musicians from Denver
Eastman School of Music alumni
American people of Iranian descent
Canadian people of Iranian descent
Guitarists from Los Angeles
Guitarists from Colorado
Jazz musicians from California
Jazz musicians from Colorado
21st-century American bass guitarists
21st-century American male musicians
Kneebody members